Ken Montgomery (born 5 January 1951) is a former Australian rules footballer who played for North Melbourne in the VFL.

A reliable half back flanker, with an unusual kicking style, Montgomery was a winning premiership player with North Melbourne in 1977, having missed out on their finals matches for the previous two years. He won the 1972 Syd Barker Medal for the club's best and fairest player and also represented Victoria in 1978. Montgomery's father, grandfather and cousin also represented the North Melbourne Football Club. Ken Montgomery was one of the youngest players to play a senior game with North Melbourne, when in 1968 he played when he was 16 years old. In later years he was in an administrative role at the club. He lives in Echuca where he operates a houseboat company called Murray River Houseboats.

References

External links

1951 births
Living people
Australian rules footballers from Melbourne
North Melbourne Football Club players
North Melbourne Football Club Premiership players
Pascoe Vale Football Club players
Syd Barker Medal winners
One-time VFL/AFL Premiership players